Barento (Oromo: Bareentoo) is one of the two major subgroups of the Oromo people. They live in the West Hararghe Zone, East Hararghe Zone, Arsi zone, of the Oromia Region of Ethiopia while the other subgroup named Borana Oromo inhabiting Oromia Special Zone Surrounding Addis Ababa, West Shewa Zone, West Welega Zone and Borena Zone of the Oromia Region of Ethiopia.

Demography
Barento are one of the two main moiety of the Oromo people in the Oromia Region of Ethiopia. Between the twelfth and fifteenth centuries, the Borana Oromo and Barentu Oromo people had differentiated from the confederation. The Barento people thereafter expanded to the eastern regions now called Hararghe, Arsi, Wello, and northeastern Shawa. The Borana people, empowered by their Gadda political and military organization expanded in the other directions, regions now called western Shawa, Welega, Illubabor, Kaffa, Gamu Goffa, Sidamo and in the 16th-century into what is now northern Kenya regions. The Borana and Barento groups are sometimes referred to as two early era moieties of the Oromo people.

Religion
The Barento Oromo people in Arsi, Bale and Hararghe regions abandoned their traditional religions and the Gadaa system of governance in the 19th century, when they were converted to Islam. In eastern regions close to Somalia, about 98.5% of the Barento people now follow Islam.

Some people away from Somalia border, in the Arsi Zone and the Bale Zone follow the traditional Oromo religion which is called Aadha, whose god is Waaq. People who follow Waaqa are often from the Borana Oromo people.

Subgroups

According to Barento there are two groups of Barento clans, the authentic Oromo and assimilated foreigners. The clans labelled Humbana are originally Oromo whereas the Sarri Sidama are non Oromo in origin and consist of various assimilated group including Harari, Somali etc. The Barento consist of the following sections or subgroups, which in turn include many subdivisions:

 The Wollo Oromo, who are the northernmost group, and live predominantly in the Oromia Zone of the Amhara Region
 The Ittu Oromo, who live in the Oromia Region from the Awash River east to a drawn south of Dire Dawa;
 The Karrayyu, who live along the Awash valley in East Shawa as well as West Hararge
 The Aniya Oromo, who live south of the Ittu and west of the Erer River;
 The Afran Qallo which refer to the 4 decedents of Qallo, which are:
Ala Oromo, living west of the city of Harar and the Erer River
Oborra Oromo, living between the Ittu and Ala Oromo 
Babille Oromo, living east of the Erer River in the Oromia Region
Dagaa Oromo (Huumee, Nole and Jarso):
 (Huumee - Mana Hiyyoo and Bursuug) who live between Laaftoo and Faafam rivers-the capital is Fuunyaan Biiraa (Gursum); 
Nole Oromo who live east of Dire Dawa and north of Harar;
Jarso who live in the northeastern corner of the Oromia Region;
 The Arsi Oromo, who primarily live in the Arsi Zone of the Oromia Region as well as the Bale Zone; and 
 The Qallu the one of Ittu tribe, who live between the Awash River Dire Dawa. And Hararghe.
 The Sherifa, who live between the Awash River and Dire Dawa East Hararge Babile Deder Gursum and West Hararge Gelemso

References

Oromo groups